Maleficium (plural: maleficia) as a Latin term, "An act of witchcraft performed with the intention of causing damage or injury; the resultant harm." In general, the term applies to any magical act intended to cause harm or death to people or property. Its modern spelling comes from "Early 17th century; earliest use found in George Abbot (1562–1633), archbishop of Canterbury. From classical Latin maleficium evil deed, injury, sorcery from maleficus + -ium". In general, the term applies to any magical act intended to cause harm or death to people or property.

Maleficium can involve the act of poisoning or drugging someone. Practitioners of maleficium are not exclusively females despite depictions in popular culture. Those accused of maleficium were punished by being imprisoned or even executed. Maleficium also used the practice of torture and it was generally considered to be performed through the power of the Devil.

Historical opinion of maleficium had been traditionally dismissive, best represented by Hugh Trevor-Roper's comment in 1969 that witchcraft beliefs were little more than 'elementary village credulities'. However, a series of influential works by Keith Thomas and Alan Macfarlane opened up an avenue of historical analysis on popular beliefs surrounding magic and maleficia. There were different charges of maleficium that were placed due to suspicion. Lewis and Russell stated, "Maleficium was a threat not only to individuals but also to public order, for a community wracked by suspicions about witches could split asunder".

"Sorcery, the practice of malevolent magic, derived from casting lots as a means of divining the future in the ancient Mediterranean world". Most scholars always assume that sorcery as a whole is always malevolent, but that witch craft can be good or evil.  Usually, the sorcerer and sorcery are feared by society.

During the 14th century, sorcery was more connected with cultures in India and Africa. A person that performs sorcery is referred to as a sorcerer, and they are thought of as someone who tries to reshape the world through the occult. Sorcerers were feared and respected throughout many societies and used many practices to achieve their goals. "Witches or sorcerers were usually feared as well as respected, and they used a variety of means to attempt to achieve their goals, including incantations (formulas or chants invoking evil spirits), divination and oracles (to predict the future), amulets and charms (to ward off hostile spirits and harmful events), potions or salves, and dolls or other figures (to represent their enemies)".

Sorcery was also thought to sometimes rely on idols or old pagan gods, demons or the devil to get its power. Practitioners sometimes did this by performing rituals. One of the rituals that they performed was the slaughtering of an animal in a field to promote fertility. Sorcerers would do this with the assisted help or power of a god, a demon, or the devil.

During the 13th century, sorcery was involved in many deaths. They were thought to be done with magic, but were usually a result of poisoning. In 1324, there was a very famous case involving a series of events caused by sorcery in Ireland. Author George Melton wrote, "Lady Alice Kyteller was charged with performing magical rites, having sexual intercourse with demons, attempting to divine the future, and poisoning her first three husbands. In the Malleus Maleficarum (1486, "The Hammer of Witches"), the famous witch-hunter's manual, Dominicans Heinrich Krämer and Jacob Sprenger associated the practice of sorcery with a group of "witches" who allegedly practiced Satanism". After this, many believed that magic had to deal with the devil rather than other gods and spirits.

In the Byzantine Empire astrologers (Lat. mathematici) were considered magical wrongdoers and so were heretics.

The term appears in several historically important texts, notably in the Formicarius (printed 1475) and in the Malleus Maleficarum (1487).

The Knights Templar were accused by Philip IV of France of maleficium. The trial of the Knights Templar set a social standard for the popular belief in maleficium and witchcraft that contributed to the great European witch hunts. In early New England, more men would get accused of such maleficium that was "non-malefic".

See also
Black shamanism
Goetia
Machiavellianism

References

Latin words and phrases
European witchcraft